Old Bridge may refer to:

Bridges 
 Bosnia and Herzegovina
 Stari Most, Mostar

 Bulgaria
 Old Bridge, Svilengrad

 Germany
 Alte Brücke (Frankfurt)
 Old Bridge (Heidelberg)

 Iran
 Old Bridge of Dezful

 Italy
 Ponte Vecchio, Florence

 Slovakia
 Starý most (Bratislava)

 Slovenia
 Kandija Bridge, Novo Mesto
 Old Bridge (Maribor)

 Turkey
 Old Bridge, Hasankeyf

 United Kingdom
 Old Bridge, Huntingdon, England
 Old Bridge, Bridgend, Wales
 Old Bridge, Pontypridd, Wales
 Hen Bont, Ponterwyd, Wales

Other uses 
 Old Bridge (CDP), New Jersey, a census-designated place
 Old Bridge (unincorporated community), New Jersey, a community in East Brunswick, New Jersey
 Old Bridge Historic District, listed on the NRHP in Middlesex County, New Jersey
 Old Bridge High School, in Old Bridge Township, New Jersey
 Old Bridge Township, New Jersey
 Operation Old Bridge, a series of arrests targeting organized crime in Italy and the United States

See also 
 Old Bridge Road (disambiguation)
 Ponte Vecchio (disambiguation)
 Stari Most (disambiguation)
 Stary Most (disambiguation)